Count It All Joy is the first extended play by Nigerian Afro-Pop recording artist Mr 2Kay. It was released exclusively to digital media outlets on the February 10, 2016, by Grafton Records for online streaming on the music app Mtn Musicplus founded by the telecom's company MTN Group .

Listening session
On Wednesday, 10 February 2016, Mr 2Kay held an album listening session at Industry Nite in Lagos. He gave a detailed account of each song on the album and signed autograph copies of the album for each guest. The event was hosted by Spanky.

Accolades
Bad Girl Special (Remix) was nominated for "Best Reggae/Dancehall Single" at the 2015 edition of The Headies.

Track listing

Release history

References 

2016 debut EPs
Grafton Entertainment EPs
Reggae EPs